The 1929 Saskatchewan general election was held on June 6, 1929 to elect members of the Legislative Assembly of Saskatchewan.

As a result of corruption scandals, the Liberal Party of Premier James Gardiner lost a significant share of its popular vote, but more important, lost twenty-two of the seats it had won in the 1925 election. While the Liberals held the largest number of seats in the legislature, they had only a minority. Gardiner tried to continue as a minority government, but was quickly defeated in a Motion of No Confidence, and resigned as premier.

The Conservative Party of James T.M. Anderson increased its representation in the legislature from three to twenty four seats. Following Gardiner's resignation, Anderson was able to form a coalition government with the support of the Progressive Party and some independents.

The Progressives had lost a large part of the popular vote it had won in 1925, but managed to retain five of the six seats it had won previously.

Results

Note: * Party did not nominate candidates in previous election.

Percentages

Members elected
For complete electoral history, see individual districts

July 16, 1929

August 12, 1929

See also
Ku Klux Klan in Canada
List of Saskatchewan political parties

References
Saskatchewan Archives Board – Election Results By Electoral Division
Elections Saskatchewan - Provincial Vote Summaries

Further reading
 

1929 elections in Canada
1929 in Saskatchewan
1929
June 1929 events